Allan William Colt MacDonald (December 2, 1891 – March 27, 1968), who used the name William Colt MacDonald for his writing, was an American writer of westerns born in Detroit, Michigan whose work appeared both in books and on film.

Biography
His many film writing credits, all for character writing, include Santa Fe Stampede (1938), Cowboys from Texas (1939), The Kansas Terrors (1939), New Frontier (1939), Wyoming Outlaw (1939), Three Texas Steers (1939), The Night Riders (1939), and Red River Range (1938).  His many novels included Gun Country (1929), Rustler's Paradise (1932), The Crimson Quirt (1949), Action at Arcanum (1958), and California Gunman (1957).

His most famous characters are The Three Mesquiteers, who first appeared together in Law of the Forty-Fives (also known as Law of the .45s and the alternative title Sunrise Guns), although two of the three Mesquiteers actually appeared in an earlier novel, Restless Guns.

Novels

Gun Country (1929)
Restless Guns (1929)
Rustler's Paradise (1932)
Law of the .45's (1933)
Powdersmoke Range (1934)
Riders of the Whistling Skull (1934)
King of Crazy River (1934)
Ghost-Town Gold (1935)
The Town That God Forgot (1935)
The Red Rider of Smoky Range (1935)
Roaring Lead (1935)
California Gunman (1936)
Bullets for Buckaroos (1936)
Sleepy Horse Range, a.k.a. Fighting Kid from Eldorado (1938)
Six-Gun Melody (1939)
Six-Shooter Showdown (1939)
The Phantom Pass (1940)
The Riddle of Ramrod Ridge (1942)
Boomtown Buccaneers (1942)
The Vanishing Gun-Slinger (1943)
The Shadow Rider (1943)
Cartridge Carnival (1945)
The Crimson Quirt (1949)
Gunsight Range (1949)
Thunderbird Trail (1949)
The Deputy of Carabina (1949) a.k.a. Two-Gun Deputy
Stir Up the Dust (1950)
Ambush at Scorpion Valley (1950) a.k.a. The Singing Scorpion
Dead Man's Gold (1951)
Sombrero (1952)
Three-notch Cameron (1952)
Cow Thief (1953)
Peaceful Jenkins (1953)
Showdown Trail (1953)
The Killer Brand (1953)
Blind Cartridges (1953)
Ranger Man (1954)
Law and Order Unlimited (1955)
Lightning Swift (1955)
The Range Kid (1955)
The Black Sombrero (1956)
Flaming Lead (1956)
Hellgate (1956)
The Mad Marshal (1958)
Ridin' Through (1958)
Blackguard (1959)
Gun Branders (1962)
Trouble Shooter (1962)
Guns Between Suns (1963)
Battle at Three Cross (1963)
Incident at Horcado City (1964) a.k.a. The Osage Bow
The Gloved Saskia (1965)
Shoot Him on Sight (1966)
Fugitive from Fear (1968)
West of Yesterday (1968)
Alias Dix Ryder (1969)
Powder Smoke (1969)
Marked Deck at Topango Wells (1970)
Rebel Ranger (1971)
The Riddle of Ramrod Ridge (1972)
Master of Mesa (1973)
Punchers of Phantom Pass (1973)
Whiplash (1973)
Wheels in the Dust (1973)
Bullet Trail (1974)
Snake Hunt (1994)
Winchester Welcome (1994)
The Gun-slingin' Gringo (1995)
Gun Fog (1997)
The Red Raider (2004)

References

External links
 

1891 births
1968 deaths
American male screenwriters
Western (genre) writers
20th-century American male writers
20th-century American screenwriters